Tintin or Tin Tin may refer to:

The Adventures of Tintin 
 The Adventures of Tintin, a comics series by Belgian cartoonist Hergé
 Tintin (character), a fictional character in the series
 The Adventures of Tintin (film), 2011, by Steven Spielberg and Peter Jackson
 The Adventures of Tintin (TV series), 1991–1992
 Tintin (magazine), 1946–1993
 Tintin (musical), 2002

People 

 Tintin Anderzon (born 1964), Swedish actress and the daughter of actress Kim Anderzon
 Tintín Márquez (born 1962), Spanish retired footballer and manager
 Greta Thunberg (born 2003), Swedish climate activist

Other
 TinTin++, a MUD online game client
 Tin Tin (band), a 1960s–1970s Australian pop group
 Tin Tin (album)
 Tin Tin (British band), 1980s, featuring Stephen Duffy
 Tin-Tin Kyrano, a Thunderbirds character
 Tin Tin Out, a British music production team
 Tintin A and B, SpaceX test satellites for Starlink

See also
 Rin Tin Tin
 Tenten (disambiguation)